is a city located in Nara Prefecture, Japan. As of March 31, 2017, the city has an estimated population of 58,386, and 24,629 households.

History
Sakurai was briefly the capital of Japan during the reign of Emperor Yūryaku.  The life of the Imperial court was centered at Hatsuse no Asakura Palace where the emperor lived in 457–479.  Other  emperors also built palaces in the area, including

 Iware no Mikakuri Palace, 480–484 in reign of Emperor Seinei
 Nimiki Palace, 499–506 in reign of Emperor Buretsu
 Iware no Tamaho Palace, 526–532 in reign of Emperor Keitai
 Hinokuma no Iorino Palace, 535-539 in reign of Emperor Senka
 Osata no Sakitama Palace or Osada no Miya, 572–585 in reign of Emperor Bidatsu
 
The modern city was founded on September 1, 1956.

Sakurai is home to Ōmiwa Shrine, traditionally considered one of the oldest Shinto shrines in Japan dedicated to the god of sake.  Sake dealers across Japan often hang a wooden sugi ball, made at Ōmiwa Shrine, as a talisman to the god of sake. It was featured in Yukio Mishima's novel Runaway Horses.

Famous places 
Buddhist temples
 Miwasanbyōdō-ji
 Hase-dera
 Asuka-dera
 Tachibana-dera
 Abe Monju-in
 Seirin-ji
Shinto shrines
 Ōmiwa Shrine
 Tanzan Shrine
 Kasayamakō Shrine
 Tamatsura Shrine

Transportation

Rail
West Japan Railway Company
Sakurai Line (Man-yō Mahoroba Line): Makimuku Station - Miwa Station - Sakurai Station
Kintetsu Railway
Osaka Line: Daifuku Station - Sakurai Station - Yamato-Asakura Station - Hasedera Station

Road
Japan National Route 165
Japan National Route 166
Japan National Route 169

Sister cities

In Japan
 Kumano, Mie
 Taisha, Shimane

Outside Japan
  Chartres, France.

References

External links 

 
 Sakurai City official website (in English) 
 

Cities in Nara Prefecture
Former capitals of Japan